A Gentle Woman is a 1969 French tragedy film directed by Robert Bresson. It is Bresson's first film in color, and adapted from Fyodor Dostoevsky's 1876 short story "A Gentle Creature". The film is set in contemporary Paris.

The tragedy is characterised by Bresson's well known ascetic style, without any dynamic sequences or professional actors' experienced and excessive expressions. Dominique Sanda, who plays the titular "gentle woman", made her debut in the film, starting her career as an actress. Bresson chose her just as a result of her first voice call.

Although the film applies a background of 1960s Paris, such as Muséum national d'histoire naturelle and Musée National d'Art Moderne, its theme adheres closely to the novella.

Bresson subsequently made another adaptation of Dostoevsky, his next film Quatre nuits d'un rêveur (Four Nights of a Dreamer) (1971) based on White Nights.

Plot
The film opens with a falling scarf, leading us to a young woman's dead body on the street. From the later scenes, we understand that the young woman was Elle (Dominique Sanda), who steps off the balcony of her Parisian apartment, plunging to her death. Why has she done it? As her distraught husband, Luc (Guy Frangin), looks over her dead body, and explores what led her to kill herself in a talk to the maid, the picture traces their lives together in flashbacks. Elle is A Gentle Creature—meek, dreamy and thoughtful. She entrances Luc, who pursues her passionately. They marry, but the match never seems right. The story reveals their desperate, despairing miscommunication. Though they try many diversions (theater, television, films) these are momentary respites for the two of them (for Elle more-so, as we see with her interest in Hamlet, which plays out in an extended scene). Their dialogue only deepens her isolation and sadness.

Cast
 Dominique Sanda as Elle
 Guy Frangin as Luc, Elle's husband
 Jeanne Lobre as Anna, the maid

References

External links
 
 

1969 films
Films based on short fiction
Films directed by Robert Bresson
1969 drama films
Films set in Paris
Films based on works by Fyodor Dostoyevsky
French drama films
1960s French films